Sviatopolk II Iziaslavich (November 8, 1050 – April 16, 1113) was supreme ruler of the Kievan Rus for 20 years, from 1093 to 1113. He was not a popular prince, and his reign was marked by incessant rivalry with his cousin Vladimir Monomakh.

Early life
Sviatopolk was the son of Iziaslav Iaroslavich by his concubine. Sviatopolk's Christian name was Michael. During his brother Iaropolk's life, Sviatopolk was not regarded as a potential claimant to the throne of Kiev. In 1069 he was sent to Polotsk, a city briefly taken by his father from the local ruler Vseslav, and then he spent ten years (1078–88) ruling Novgorod. Upon his brother's death he succeeded him in Turov, which would remain in possession of his descendants until the 17th century.

Reign

When Vsevolod Iaroslavich died in 1093, Sviatopolk was acknowledged by other princes as the senior son of Veliki Kniaz and permitted to ascend the Kievan throne. Although he participated in the princely congresses organized by Vladimir Monomakh, he is sometimes charged with encouraging internecine wars among Rurikid princes. For instance, he sided with his cousin David of Volhynia and his son-in-law Bolesław III Wrymouth in capturing and blinding one of the Galician princes. He also sided with Vladimir Monomakh in several campaigns against the Kipchaks but was defeated in the Battle of the Stugna River (1093). Later that year, Sviatopolk would face the Kipchaks again, and again be defeated, whereupon the Kipchaks destroyed Torchesk, an Oghuz Turk settlement.

In 1096, in an attempt to force Oleg I of Chernigov into a Rus compact, Sviatopolk left his lands undefended. His father-in-law, Tugorkhan, raided Pereiaslavl, while Boniak raided as far as Kiev, destroying Berestovo and sacking the three monasteries of Klov, Vydubichi, and the Caves. Tugorkhan was killed during his raid on Pereiaslavl, and so Sviatopolk had him buried in Kiev.

Sviatopolk's Christian name was Michael, so he encouraged embellishment of St Michael's Abbey in Kiev, which has been known as the Golden-Roofed up to the present. The history now known as the Primary Chronicle was compiled by the monk Nestor during Sviatopolk's reign.

Marriage and children
Sviatopolk married firstly a Bohemian princess (Přemyslid dynasty), probably a daughter of Duke Spytihněv II. They had three children:
 Zbyslava, married to king Boleslaw III of Poland on November 15, 1102.
 Predslava, married to Prince Álmos of Hungary on August 21, 1104. Her fate is less known.
 Iaroslav (died 1123), Prince of Volynia and Turov was married three times - to the Hungarian-Polish Sophia (daughter of Władysław I Herman and his second wife Judith of Swabia), and Kievan princesses. In consequence of Iaroslav's early death, his descendants forfeited any right to the Kievan throne and had to content themselves with Turov and Pinsk. 

Secondly, in 1094 Sviatopolk married a daughter of Tugorkhan of the Kypchaks, Olena. They had four children:
 Anna (died 1136), married to Sviatoslav Davydych from Chernihiv who took monastic vows upon her death and later became Saint Nikolai Svyatoslav Davydych of Chernihiv.
 Maria, married Piotr Włostowic, castellan of Wroclaw and Polish palatine.
 Bryachislav (1104–1127), possibly dethroned Iaroslav as the Prince of Turov (1118–1123) in 1118.
 Iziaslav (died 1127), possibly the Prince of Turov in 1123.

In 1104, Sviatopolk would marry for a third time to Barbara Komnena.

Some sources claim Sviatopolk had an out-of-wedlock son, Mstislav, who ruled Novgorod-Sieversky from 1095–1097 and later Volyn (1097–1099). Mstislav later was murdered in Volodymyr-Volynski.

See also
 List of Russian rulers
 List of Ukrainian rulers

Footnotes

References

External links
Detailed biography

1050 births
1113 deaths
Rurik dynasty
Princes of Polotsk
Princes of Novgorod
Princes of Turov
Grand Princes of Kiev
11th-century princes in Kievan Rus'
12th-century princes in Kievan Rus'
Eastern Orthodox monarchs
Iziaslavichi family (Polotsk)